The 60th Primetime Emmy Awards were held on Sunday, September 21, 2008, at the newly opened Nokia Theatre in Los Angeles, California to honor the best in U.S. prime time television. The ceremony was hosted by Tom Bergeron, Heidi Klum, Howie Mandel, Jeff Probst, and Ryan Seacrest (all were nominated in the debut category—Outstanding Host for a Reality or Reality-Competition Program) and televised in the United States on ABC.

The nominations were announced on July 17 by Kristin Chenoweth and Neil Patrick Harris. The Creative Arts Emmy Awards were held eight days earlier (September 13) at the same venue. The ceremony was hosted by Neil Patrick Harris and Sarah Chalke.

The telecast was viewed by 12.20 million with a household rating of 8.86/12.79 making it the lowest rated and least viewed ceremony in its televised history. Many critics cited lackluster performances from the five hosts as a reason for the huge decline. Others pointed to the field of nominees which were dominated by low-rated and sparsely viewed programs, thus making the Emmys widely considered as a bust, which was panned by critics as "... the worst ever, laid a big, fat ratings egg as well ..."

In 2011, when TV Guide Network re-did their list of "25 Biggest TV Blunders", this ceremony was included.

For the first time in a decade, the Primetime Emmy Award for Outstanding Comedy Series was won by the defending champion. 30 Rock

Outstanding Drama Series went to AMC freshmen series Mad Men. This marked the first series award for a program on a basic cable station. Mad Men led all dramas with seven major nominations.

This would be the final ceremony to have five nominees per category, most major categories (acting and programs) were expanded to include at least six slots the following year.

Tin Mans win for Outstanding Makeup for a Miniseries or Movie (Non-Prosthetic) made The Wizard of Oz the third franchise to complete EGOT status.

Winners and nominees
Winners are listed first and highlighted in bold:

Programs

Acting

Lead performances

Supporting performances

Hosting

Directing

Writing

Most major nominations
By network 
 HBO – 44
 NBC – 30
 ABC – 29
 CBS – 11

By program
 John Adams (HBO) – 8
 Mad Men (AMC) – 7
 Damages (FX) / The Office / “30 Rock” (NBC) – 6

Most major awards
By network 
 HBO – 11
 NBC – 6
 ABC – 4
 AMC – 3
 CBS / Comedy Central / FX – 2

By program
 John Adams (HBO) – 5
 30 Rock - 4 (NBC)
 Mad Men (AMC) / Damages (FX) – 2

Notes

Presenters
The awards were presented by the following:

In Memoriam

 George Carlin (twice)
 Bernie Brillstein
 Joey Bishop
 William F. Buckley Jr.
 Charlton Heston
 Les Crane
 Alice Ghostley
 Ivan Dixon
 Cyd Charisse
 Mel Ferrer
 Claudio Guzmán
 Barry Morse
 Deborah Kerr
 Larry Harmon
 Estelle Getty
 Roger King
 Sydney Pollack
 Ron Leavitt
 Bernie Mac
 Eric Lieber
 Suzanne Pleshette
 Abby Mann
 Dick Martin
 Delbert Mann
 Harvey Korman
 Jim McKay
 Lois Nettleton
 Mel Tolkin
 Richard Widmark
 Stan Winston
 Tim Russert
 Isaac Hayes

References

External links
 Emmys.com list of 2008 Nominees & Winners
 Academy of Television Arts and Sciences website
 

060
Primetime Emmy Awards
2008 awards in the United States
2008 in Los Angeles
September 2008 events in the United States